The 1993 Women's South American Volleyball Championship was the 20th edition of the Women's South American Volleyball Championship, organised by South America's governing volleyball body, the Confederación Sudamericana de Voleibol (CSV). It was held at Coliseo de la Juventud in Cuzco, Peru from September 12 to 19, 1993.

Teams

Competition System
The competition system for the 1993 Women's South American Championship consisted of a Round-Robin system in which the top two teams in the ranking would play in the final match. On the first round each team plays once against each of the 5 remaining teams. Points are accumulated during the entire round, and the ranking is determined by the total points gained. Matches played against Peru's Junior team did not count towards the final ranking.

First round

Standings

Final Match

|}

Final standing

Team Roster:
Sonia Ayaucán,
Milagros Cámere,
Margarita Delgado,
Miriam Gallardo,
Rosa Garcia,
Sara Joya,
Natalia Málaga,
Gabriela Perez del Solar and
Janet Vasconsuelo

Head coach: Park Man-bok

Individual awards

Most Valuable Player

Best Spiker

Best Blocker

Best Server

Best Digger

Best Setter

Best Receiver

Notes
 Bolivia withdrew from the competition last minute, Peru's junior team was invited to play Bolivia's matches.

References

External links
CSV official website

Women's South American Volleyball Championships
South American Volleyball Championships
Volleyball
V
1993 in South American sport
September 1993 sports events in South America